Pee Dee Creek may refer to:

 Pee Dee Creek (Mississippi)
 Pee Dee Creek (Missouri)

See also
 Pee Dee River